Anchorage is a major center of media in Alaska. The following is a list of media outlets based in the city.

Print

Newspapers
The Anchorage Daily News is the city's primary newspaper, published daily. Other papers published in the city include:
Alaska Journal of Commerce, business, weekly
Anchorage Press, alternative newspaper, weekly
Bristol Bay Times, Southwest Alaska news, weekly
Dutch Harbor Fisherman, Aleutian and Pribilof Islands news, weekly
The Northern Light, University of Alaska Anchorage student newspaper, weekly

Radio
The following is a list of radio stations licensed to and/or broadcasting from Anchorage.

AM

FM

Television
The Anchorage television market includes Anchorage, Matanuska-Susitna Borough, and Kenai Peninsula Borough. In its Fall 2013 ranking of television markets by population, Arbitron ranked the Anchorage market 146th in the United States.

The following is a list of television stations that broadcast from and/or are licensed to Anchorage.

References

Anchorage
 Anchorage